Chéreng is a commune of the Nord department in northern France.

Heraldry

Twinning
Chereng is twinned with East Peckham, Kent, United Kingdom.

See also
Communes of the Nord department

References

Communes of Nord (French department)
French Flanders